The Macedonian Women's League is a women's football league of North Macedonia.

The winning team of the league qualifies for a spot in the UEFA Women's Champions League.

2020–21 clubs 
ŽFK ACT Junajted
ŽFK Atletiko
ŽFK Borec
ŽFK Dragon 2014
ŽFK Istatov
ŽFK Kamenica Sasa
ŽFK Kočani
ŽFK Ljuboten
ŽFK Plačkovica
ŽFK Pobeda Prilep
ŽFK Rečica
ŽFK Shkëndija Tetovo
ŽFK Tiverija Istatov
ŽFK Top Gol

Champions 
The list of past champions:
2001–02: unknown
2002–03: Škiponjat
2003–04: Škiponjat
2004–05: Škiponjat
2005–06: Škiponjat
2006–07: Škiponjat
2007–08: Škiponjat
2008–09: Tikvešanka
2009–10: Borec
2010–11: Naše Taksi
2011–12: Naše Taksi
2012–13: Biljanini Izvori
2013–14: Kočani
2014–15: Dragon
2015–16: Dragon
2016–17: Istatov
2017–18: Dragon
2018–19: Dragon
2019–20: Kamenica Sasa
2020–21: Kamenica Sasa
2021–22: Ljuboten

By titles

References

External links 
 Official Website of the Macedonian Football Federation
 League at uefa.com
 makfudbal.com; standings and results

Women's football in North Macedonia
Top level women's association football leagues in Europe
football